Vivek Shraya (born February 15, 1981) is a Canadian musician, writer, and visual artist. She currently lives in Calgary, Alberta, where she is an assistant professor in the creative writing program at the University of Calgary. As a trans woman of colour, Shraya often incorporates her identity in her music, writing, visual art, theatrical work, and films. She is a seven-time Lambda Literary Award finalist, and considered a Great Canadian Filmmaker of the Future by CBC Arts.

Shraya is dedicated to bringing creative writing opportunities to emerging BIPOC writers over the age of 50 through the founding of her award-winning publishing imprint VS. Books, which serves as a "mentorship and publishing opportunity" for these writers.

Shraya is also a director on the board of the Tegan and Sara Foundation, which fights for health, economic justice and representation for LGBTQ women.

Currently, she is focusing on the adaptation of her debut play, How to Fail as a Popstar, for use on television with the support of CBC.

Career

Music

Shraya began writing songs at the age of 13 and released her first album, THROAT, in 2002. Since then, she has released a dozen solo albums in a range of genres, including If We're Not Talking (2007), Keys & Machines (2009) and 1:1 (2011). Shraya has also created two albums, Bronze (2015) and Angry (2018), with her band, Too Attached, which she and her brother, Shamik Bilgi, formed in 2015. She has toured extensively in North America, both as a solo artist and with Too Attached, sharing the stage with Tegan and Sara, Dragonette, Melanie C, Team Dresch, Melissa Ferrick, Brian Byrne, Greg MacPherson and Bonjay.

Shraya's 2017 album, Part-Time Woman, a collaboration with the Queer Songbook Orchestra, was named one of the 17 best Canadian albums of 2017 by CBC Arts and longlisted for the 2018 Polaris Music Prize.

Writing

In 2010, Shraya published her first book, God Loves Hair, an illustrated collection of 21 linked short stories about a brown, genderqueer child growing up in immigrant family in Alberta. God Loves Hair was nominated for a 2011 Lambda Literary Award in the Children's/Young Adult category. Shraya's second book, She of the Mountains, a lyrical novel consisting of two intertwined love stories, was named one of The Globe and Mails Best 100 Books of 2014, and nominated for a 2015 Lambda Literary Award for Transgender Fiction. Shraya was awarded the Honour of Distinction at the 2015 Dayne Ogilvie Awards.

In 2016, Shraya released her debut poetry collection, even this page is white, an incisive exploration of the effects of everyday racism and colonialism in Canada that won a 2017 Publishing Triangle award and was longlisted for CBC's Canada Reads. The Boy & The Bindi, a children's picture book about a young boy's fascination with the dot on his mother's forehead, was also published in 2016. Shraya's first non-fiction book, I’m Afraid of Men, was released in August 2018.  

In 2017, Shraya partnered with Arsenal Pulp Press to create an imprint, VS. Books. Through VS. Books, Shraya supports young writers of colour by providing mentorship through the writing and editing processes and publishing a book by a different emerging artist every year. The first VS. title, Téa Mutonji's short story collection Shut Up You're Pretty, was published in 2019.

Shraya's first graphic non-fiction work Death Threat was published by Arsenal Pulp Press in 2019. Ness Lee did the visual art for the book.

Shraya's second novel The Subtweet was published on April 7, 2020 by ECW Press. The book is focused on an intense friendship between two women of colour musicians.

Quill & Quire reviewed The Subtweet in March 2020, concluding that "While it wrestles with the political realities of working in the arts and navigating social media, The Subtweet also elucidates certain social-justice modes of thought. Shraya’s narrative pushes back against the ways mainstream and pop-culture formulations of social justice are used to further agendas misaligned with principles of equity. It critiques the ways in which social-justice rhetoric can be wielded as a weapon for the purpose of self-aggrandizement or the pursuit of personal vendettas. The Subtweet attempts to nudge the reader toward a more critical perspective and to encourage the reader to be more skeptical of what comes out of the mouths of public figures, especially when money and politics are involved."

Shraya's 2022 book People Change was published by Penguin Random House and was included in CBC Books list of "26 Canadian Books to Read for Pride Month".

Media and visual arts

Shraya has created five short films that have screened at festivals across Canada and internationally. In 2016, she released a photo series, Trisha, featuring old photos of her mother displayed alongside contemporary re-creations of the images with Shraya herself as the subject. This project has been shown in galleries across North America and a digital version of Trisha has circulated internationally.

Before coming out as a trans woman on February 15, 2016, Shraya made the film, Seeking Single White Male on August 1, 2010. This film depicts a set of pictures of Shraya increasingly altering her features to those more associated with a Caucasian person. The images depict the bleaching of her brown hair to blonde in addition to the constant use of blue eye contacts over her brown eyes. In a post on her website just over two years after the original post, Shraya shares that the purpose behind the film was “to show how the internalization of racism can manifest externally.” An analysis of Seeking Single White Male completed in June 2019 reveals that “The comments incorporated into this video clearly address the existence of racialized conceptions of desirability within the gay community in Ontario, Canada.” Prior to 2010, Shraya altered her appearance to appear more Caucasian in response to the “racialized conceptions of desirability” in the Edmonton gay bars that she frequented. Seeking Single White Male has been shown in multiple screenings including the Vancouver Queer Film Festival in 2011 and the Reel Asian International Film Festival in Toronto, ON in 2012.

Shraya's first theatrical work debuted on February 18, 2020. The work is called "How to Fail as a Popstar," chronicling "her journey to 'not quite' pop music superstardom. A reflection on the power of pop culture, dreams, disappointments and self-determination, this astonishing performance is a triumph in finding one’s authentic voice." The play includes original songs written and performed by Shraya.

In 2020, Shraya partnered with Pantene on their global Hair Has No Gender Project, highlighting the importance of hair in a trans or gender non-binary person's identity and transition. The campaign's film included a conversation about self-expression and familial support between Shraya and her father, Mohan Bilgi.

Personal life

Vivek Shraya identifies as bisexual. On February 15, 2016, Shraya also came out as transgender and announced via her Facebook account that she is now using she/her pronouns.

Discography
Samsara: The Sketches (2002)
THROAT EP (2003)
A Composite of Straight Lines (2005)
If We're Not Talking (2007)
If We're Not Talking Single (2008)
Keys & Machines (2009)
Part Time Woman (2017)
Baby, You're Projecting (2023)

Books
God Loves Hair (2010)
She of the Mountains (2014)
even this page is white (2016)
The Boy & the Bindi (2016) 
I'm Afraid of Men (2018)
Death Threat (2019)
The Subtweet (2020)
Next Time There's a Pandemic (2022)
People Change

References

External links
Vivek Shraya

1981 births
Living people
Canadian people of Indian descent
Writers from Edmonton
Writers from Toronto
Canadian writers of Asian descent
Queer writers
21st-century Canadian novelists
Canadian LGBT novelists
Canadian LGBT poets
21st-century Canadian short story writers
Transgender artists
Canadian transgender writers
Transgender women musicians
Canadian electronic musicians
Canadian dance musicians
Canadian LGBT singers
Musicians from Toronto
Musicians from Edmonton
Canadian women novelists
Canadian women short story writers
21st-century Canadian women writers
Academic staff of the University of Calgary
Transgender academics
Transgender women
Transgender singers
Transgender poets
Transgender novelists
21st-century Canadian LGBT people
Canadian LGBT academics